Wyatt Robert "Bull" Ruther (February 5, 1923, Pittsburgh – October 31, 1999, San Francisco) was an American jazz double-bassist.

Ruther played trombone in high school before picking up the double-bass. He studied at the San Francisco Conservatory of Music and the Pittsburgh Musical Institute, then played in New York City with Dave Brubeck (1951–52) and Erroll Garner (1951-55). He toured with Lena Horne in 1953 and recorded an album under his own name alongside Milt Hinton in 1955 for RCA Records entitled Basses Loaded. Following this he played with Toshiko Akiyoshi in 1956, then studied at the Royal Conservatory of Music in Toronto, Canada. While in Canada he played with the Canadian Jazz Quartet (1956–57) and Peter Appleyard (1957). He played in the U.S. during the same period with Ray Bryant, Zoot Sims, Bob Brookmeyer, and Chico Hamilton. He toured with George Shearing in 1959 and then played on a world tour with Buddy Rich in 1960–61. In 1962-63 he played in Gerry Mulligan's quartet, then joined Count Basie in 1964–65.

Later in the 1960s, Ruther worked freelance in the San Francisco area, and played at the Olympic Hotel in Seattle from 1971 to 1973. He then moved to Vancouver, British Columbia, Canada, and played with Fraser MacPherson from 1975 to 1979. He played at the Ankor Hotel in Vancouver in the early 1980s, and while there worked with Sammy Price, Jay McShann, and Dorothy Donegan. He returned to San Francisco in 1984, where he played until his death in 1999 when he died of a heart attack at age 76; he played with Stan Getz, Lou Stein, John Handy, Benny Carter, and Jerome Richardson in the late 1980s and early 1990s. Late in life he played regularly at the Bix Supper Club.

Discography
With Ray Bryant 
Ray Bryant Trio (Epic, 1956)
With Al Grey 
Shades of Grey (Tangerine, 1965)
With Chico Hamilton
The Chico Hamilton Quintet with Strings Attached (Warner Bros., 1958)
Gongs East! (Warner Bros., 1958)
The Three Faces of Chico (Warner Bros., 1959)
That Hamilton Man (SESAC, 1959)
With Erroll Garner
Mambo Moves Garner (Mercury, 1954)
With The Dave Brubeck Quartet:
Brubeck-Desmond - 4 Tracks - Vogue LAE 12114 Recorded November 1951

References

John Curry, "Wyatt Ruther". Grove Jazz online.

1923 births
1999 deaths
American jazz double-bassists
Male double-bassists
Musicians from Pittsburgh
The Royal Conservatory of Music alumni
20th-century American musicians
Jazz musicians from Pennsylvania
20th-century double-bassists
20th-century American male musicians
American male jazz musicians